Cheomhae of Silla (r. 247–261, died  261), often known by his title Cheomhae Isageum, was the twelfth ruler of the Korean kingdom of Silla.  He was a Seok, and the younger brother of the previous king, Jobun.

The Samguk Sagi also reports that the Cheomhae forged a truce with Goguryeo, and that his reign saw repeated clashes with Baekje.  Cheomhae's kinsman, the general Uro, was slain by the people of Wa in the year 250.

The defeat at this time dealt a serious blow to Silla. Later, Silla became close to Baekje and Goguryeo to guard against Japan even though Baekje was the overlord of its mercenary vassal, Wa (Japan). Given that some of the conquered city-states reappeared as Gaya, some city-states became independent. It was not until the reign of King Jijeung that Silla overcame the aftereffects and resumed its conquest.

Family 

 Grandfather: Beolhyu of Silla (died 196, r. 184–196)
 Grandmther: Unknown Queen
 Father: Seok Goljeong (석골정)
 Mother: Queen Ongmo, of the Park clan (옥모)
 Brother: Jobun of Silla

See also
Three Kingdoms of Korea
Rulers of Korea
History of Korea

References

Silla rulers
261 deaths
3rd-century monarchs in Asia
Year of birth unknown
3rd-century Korean people